Sujan Singh Pathania (1943 – 2021) was an Indian politician. He served as minister and sitting legislator, from Jawali and Fatehpur Assembly constituency.

References

1943 births
2021 deaths
Indian National Congress politicians from Himachal Pradesh